Iván Rodrigo Trujillo Vanegas (born June 28, 1982) is a Colombian football forward who currently plays for ACD Lara.

Club career

Colombia
Trujillo made his debut in the Colombian First Division in 2004 with Deportivo Cali. He was loaned out to CD Atlético Huila, where he began to establish himself in the Colombian First Division. While at Huila he scored 9 goals in 33 appearances. He then returned to Cali and became a regular at the club during the 2006 campaign. His most productive season was in 2007 where he scored 11 goals in 31 First division matches.

Major League Soccer
Trujillo scored in his debut for the Kansas City Wizards against D.C. United on March 29, 2008. However, Trujillo struggled during the rest of the 2008 season and struggled to make the starting eleven.

References

External links
 

1982 births
Living people
Colombian footballers
Association football forwards
Deportivo Cali footballers
Atlético Huila footballers
Once Caldas footballers
La Equidad footballers
Sporting Kansas City players
Deportes Quindío footballers
Deportivo Zacapa players
América de Cali footballers
Llaneros F.C. players
Asociación Civil Deportivo Lara players
Colombian expatriate footballers
Expatriate soccer players in the United States
Expatriate footballers in Guatemala
Expatriate footballers in Venezuela
Major League Soccer players
Sportspeople from Cauca Department